Tafsir al-Qurtubi is a  13th-century work of Qur'an exegesis (Arabic: tafsir) by the classical scholar Al-Qurtubi. Considered one of the best and most iconic tafsirs to date. The tafsir of Al-Qurtubi is regarded as one of the most compendious exegesis of them all and is truly among the most popular. Tafsir al-Qurtubi is also known as Al-Jami' li Ahkam al-Qur'an (The General Judgments of the Qur’an) as its name suggests. 

The basic objective of this tafsir was to deduce juristic injunctions and rulings from the Quran yet, while doing so, al-Qurtubi has also provided the explanation of verses, research into difficult words, discussion of diacritical marks and elegance of style and composition. The book has been published repeatedly.

Features
Mufti Muhammad Taqi Usmani (DB) has written in his 'Uloomu-l-Qur'an (An Approach to the Qur'anic Sciences):

Al-Qurtubi was a follower of Imam Malik ibn Anas's school of thought in Islamic Jurisprudence. The basic purpose of this book was to deduce juristic injunctions and rulings from the Qur'anic Ayat but in this connection he has very aptly commented on the meanings of Ayat, scrutiny of difficult words, composition and rhetoric and relevant narrations in the exegesis. Particularly the instructions obtainable from the Qur'an for everyday life have been clearly explained. The preface of this book is also detailed and comprises important discussions on the sciences of the Qur'an.

Translations

This tafsir has been translated into many languages. It can be read in English, Urdu, Arabic and Spanish languages at Australian Islamic Library.

Among the newer translations is an Urdu translation of the first volume by Dr. Ikram-ul-Haq Yaseen. Work on the second volume is in progress. The first volume has been published by the Shari`ah Academy, at International Islamic University, Islamabad.

First and second part of Bengali translation have been published by Tawheed Publication from Bangladesh. It will be published in 23 volumes. 

One volume has been translated into English and published by Dar al-Taqwa, London. The first six volumes have been translated into English by Aisha Bewley and published by Diwan Press.

See also
 List of Sunni books

References

Qurtubi